Kiss Me may refer to:

Film
 Kiss Me (1929 film), a French silent comedy film
 Kiss Me (1932 film), a French comedy film
 Kiss Me (2011 film) or With Every Heartbeat, a Swedish drama film
 Kiss Me (2014 film), an American romantic drama film

Music

Albums
 Kiss Me (album), Japanese title for Mambo No. Sex, by E-Rotic, 1999, or the title song
 Kiss Me, Kiss Me, Kiss Me, by the Cure, 1987

Songs
 "Kiss Me" (C. Jérôme song), 1972
 "Kiss Me" (Indecent Obsession song), 1992
 "Kiss Me" (Olly Murs song), 2015
 "Kiss Me" (Sixpence None the Richer song), 1998
 "Kiss Me" (Tin Tin song), 1982
 "Kiss Me", written by Noël Coward from the operetta Bitter Sweet
 "Kiss Me", by Cassie from Cassie, 2006
 "Kiss Me", by the Del-Vikings, 1968
 "Kiss Me", by EC2, 1990
 "Kiss Me", by Ed Sheeran from +, 2011
 "Kiss Me", by George Maharis, 1963
 "Kiss Me", by Johnny Burnette, 1958
 "Kiss Me", by Marvin & Johnny
 "Kiss Me", by Sabrina Salerno from Sabrina, 1987

Other uses
 Kiss Me, a brand of Isehan Cosmetics, launched in 1935

See also
 Kiss (disambiguation)
 Kiss Me, Kill Me (disambiguation)
 Kiss You (disambiguation)